Below is a list of radio stations in Metro Davao, whose coverage is in part or whole of the same.

AM Stations

FM Stations

References

Davao